Elmwood, Ontario may refer to several places in Ontario, Canada:
 Elmwood, Frontenac County, Ontario
 Elmwood, Grey County, Ontario

See also
 Elmwood (disambiguation)